Co-Ed Confidential is a cable series that is Cinemax's erotic remake of National Lampoon's Animal House (1978) and was originally shown on Cinemax.

Production
The series made its premiere in 2007 and had four seasons comprising a total of 52 original episodes plus six compilations. This series mainly contains simulated sex scenes. The fourth season premiered June 1, 2010 and the series finale aired on August 27, 2010. 
A reunion aired on July 23, 2014 featuring Michelle Maylene, Brad Bufanda, and Andre Boyer.

Plot
The dean of students at a university shuts down a wild fraternity called Omega House. The building is then turned into a co-ed residence for four freshmen supervised by graduate student Ophelia (Hannah Harper) and her significant other, James, the former president of Omega House.

Reception

Many have praised the show for having witty scripts and dialog for a soft core show. The erotic series premiered on November 2, 2007. 
The program is said to be a hybrid of comedy and soft core; the first of its kind for the genre.

Cast

Episodes

Season 1 (2007–08)

Season 2 (2008)

Season 3 (2009)

Season 4 (2010)

References

External links
 

2007 American television series debuts
2010 American television series endings
2000s American college television series
2010s American college television series
2000s American comedy-drama television series
2010s American comedy-drama television series
2000s American sex comedy television series
2010s American sex comedy television series
Cinemax original programming
Television series by Warner Bros. Television Studios
English-language television shows
Erotic television series